Rodney Scott Taylor (born August 2, 1967) is a former Major League Baseball pitcher.

Drafted out of Bowling Green State University by the Boston Red Sox in 1988, Taylor made his major league debut for the Red Sox on September 17, 1992, at age 25. He pitched in parts of two seasons for the Red Sox, with his last appearance coming on October 3, 1993. Taylor continued to pitch in the minors until 1998, ending his career with the Rochester Red Wings in the Baltimore Orioles organization.

Taylor pitched a total of 25.2 innings in 20 major league games, striking out 15 batters. He had a career ERA of 6.31, allowing five home in 27 hits.

References

External links

Scott Taylor at Baseball Almanac

Major League Baseball pitchers
Boston Red Sox players
Baseball players from Ohio
People from Defiance, Ohio
Bowling Green Falcons baseball players
1967 births
Living people
Calgary Cannons players
Elmira Pioneers players
Lynchburg Red Sox players
New Britain Red Sox players
Pawtucket Red Sox players